Wittenburg is a community in the Canadian province of Nova Scotia, located in  Colchester County. It was named for Wittenberg, Germany, due to a resemblance of the local church to the church where Martin Luther nailed up his 95 theses.

Navigator

References

External links
Wittenburg on Destination Nova Scotia

Communities in Colchester County
General Service Areas in Nova Scotia